Casa de Piedra, also known as Residencia Amparo Roldán, in Aguadilla, Puerto Rico, is a Spanish Colonial-style home that was erected in 1875.  It is the only surviving residence of its era in Aguadilla;  most similar ones were damaged in the 1918 San Fermín earthquake and eventually demolished.

It was listed on the National Register of Historic Places of Puerto Rico in 1986.

It was built on stone foundations of an even older building that has been suggested to be the home of Ponce de Leon.

References

Houses completed in 1875
Piedra (Aguadilla, Puerto Rico)
Spanish Colonial architecture in Puerto Rico
National Register of Historic Places in Aguadilla, Puerto Rico
1870s establishments in Puerto Rico
Juan Ponce de León